Zgornje Partinje is a settlement in the Municipality of Sveti Jurij v Slovenskih Goricah in northeastern Slovenia. It is dispersed over a large area of the western Slovene Hills between Globovnica Creek and James Creek, left tributaries of the Pesnica River. The area is part of the traditional region of Styria. It is now included in the Drava Statistical Region.

References

External links
Zgornje Partinje at Geopedia

Populated places in the Municipality of Sveti Jurij v Slovenskih Goricah